Woodhouse is an English surname.

It is of the same etymology, but to be distinguished from, the surname of the  Wodehouse family of Norfolk. The family of Woodhouse of Womburne Woodhouse originates with Benedict Wodehouse of Womburne (fl. 1550); the spelling Woodhouse was used from the 17th century. The modern surname may derive from any of several places called Woodhouse or Wodehouse in England, and people who share the surname are not necessarily related to the Womburne Woodhouse family, or to one another.

Notable people with the surname include:
 Airini Woodhouse (1896–1989), New Zealand community leader, historian, and author
 Barbara Woodhouse (1910–1988), British dog trainer and television personality
 Brad Woodhouse, communications director of the United States Democratic National Committee
 Charles Woodhouse (1893–1978), British admiral
 Chase G. Woodhouse (1890–1984), Canadian educator and (United States) congresswoman
 Christopher Woodhouse, 6th Baron Terrington (born 1946), British urologist
 Curtis Woodhouse (born 1980), English footballer and boxer
 Dallas Woodhouse (born 1972/3), American political operative
 Danielle Woodhouse (born 1969), Australian water polo player
 Fred Woodhouse (born 1912), Australian athlete
 Frederick W. Woodhouse (1821–1909) and (1846–1927), Australian painters
 George Woodhouse (1924–1988), English cricketer and brewer
 Hall & Woodhouse, English brewery, owned by the above
 Greg Woodhouse (born 1960), Australian footballer
 Hedley Woodhouse (1920–1984), Canadian jockey
 Henry Woodhouse (disambiguation), several people
 Herbert James Woodhouse (1854–1937), Australian painter
 James Woodhouse, (1770–1809), United States chemist
 James Woodhouse, 1st Baron Terrington, (1852–1921), British politician
 John Woodhouse (1884–1955), English bishop
 Jonathan Woodhouse (minister) (born 1955), British minister, former Chaplain General
 Joyce Woodhouse (born 1944), American politician
 Luke Woodhouse (born 1988), English darts player
 Mark Woodhouse (basketball) (born 1982), British basketball player
 Mark Woodhouse (cricketer) (born 1967), Zimbabwean cricketer
 Martin Woodhouse (1932–2011), British author and scriptwriter
 Mary Woodhouse (died 1656), musician and letter writer.
 Michael Woodhouse (born c. 1965), New Zealand politician
 Montague Woodhouse, 5th Baron Terrington (1917–2001), British politician and writer
 Owen Woodhouse (1916–2014), New Zealand judge
 Robert Woodhouse (1773–1827), English mathematician
 Rob Woodhouse (born 1966), Australian Olympic swimmer turned company director
 Robyn Woodhouse (born 1943), Australian high jumper
 Samuel Washington Woodhouse (1821–1904), American surgeon, explorer and naturalist
 Stan Woodhouse (1899–1977), English footballer
 Thomas Woodhouse (died 1573), English Roman Catholic martyr
 Tristram Woodhouse (born 1974), Australian field hockey player
 Vera Woodhouse, Lady Terrington (1889–1956), British politician
 Violet Gordon-Woodhouse (1872–1951), British harpsichordist
 William Woodhouse (cricketer) (1856–1938), English cricketer
 William Woodhouse (artist) (1857–1939), English artist
 William Woodhouse (naval officer) (before 1517 – 1564), MP for Great Yarmouth, Norwich, and Norfolk
 William Woodhouse (MP for Aldeburgh), MP for Aldeburgh 1604–1621
 William John Woodhouse (1866–1937), English classical scholar and author

Fictional characters
 Emma Woodhouse, eponymous heroine of Jane Austen's novel Emma
 Woodhouse, valet to the title character in the 2009 American animated TV series Archer

References

See also
 Wodehouse (surname)
 Baron Terrington

English-language surnames
English toponymic surnames